Robert Lazarik Hines (born January 17, 1970) is an American comedian and actor.  He is best known for his role as Toby Jones in a series of viral spoof commercials that include "Jones' Good-Ass BBQ and Foot Massage".

Early life
Hines was born in Chicago, Illinois to Vera Mae and Bobby Frank Hines. He attended Chicago Vocational High School on Chicago's South Side. In August 1988, Hines enlisted in the U.S. Army Reserves and was a reservist for six years, serving as a Cannon Crewman, Field Artillery.

Career

Working at Cook County Jail
To support himself while honing his skills as a comedian, Hines began working as a Correctional Officer at Chicago's Cook County Jail in 1994, at the age of 24. He quit the job in 2003 when he was cast to star in the independent comedy movie, Chasing Robert, which featured performances by Andy Dick, Larry Miller, Paul Provenza, Rick Overton and Dan Castellaneta.

Stand-up comedy
Hines started doing stand-up comedy at the age of 21. His first performance was in June 1991 at the Funny Firm, a Chicago comedy club owned by Len Austrevitch, who would later cast Hines in his first film roles. After his set, Hines met local comedians Bernie Mac, Evan Lionel, Daran Howard and Shay Shay (Phillip White). Mac and Lionel booked Hines on the spot for their Monday night show at Chicago's Cotton Club, where Hines continued to appear for nearly a year. All four comedians became mentors and friends of Hines. From 1991 to 1996, Daran Howard tapped Hines to perform in his Laugh Fest College Comedy Tour with shows targeted to historically Black colleges.  Hines credits Shay Shay with helping him learn to make his comedy more personal, telling Steven Johnson of the Chicago Tribune, "Shay told me I've got to show them my pain."

In addition to touring and club performances (primarily in the Midwest), Hines has made a number of national TV appearances, including BET's Comic View, Comedy Central's Comic Justice and Fox's Uptown Comedy Club. In 1995, Hines was nominated for the Sammy Davis, Jr. Musical Comedy Award by BET's Comic View Comedy Awards TV show.

Toby Jones
In 2008, Hines was cast to portray the character Toby Jones in an internet commercial spoof titled Jones’ Big Ass Truck Rental and Storage produced by Big Dog Eat Child— a Chicago sketch comedy group. The character is created by Ramiro Castro Jr. and based on the sketch he wrote in 2005 of the same name. The ad featured a real web address and Hines' actual cellphone number and was inspired by the local hard-sell TV commercials the creators— brothers Pedro Castro and Ramiro Castro— saw growing up in Chicago. The two had spotted Hines during a stand-up comedy performance at Chicago's Lakeshore Theater in January 2008.

The Jones’ Big Ass Truck Rental and Storage video was released in November 2008, and became a viral video sensation, garnering over 700,000 views in its first two weeks of release. Hines received hundreds of calls to his cellphone from all over the world, with many people believing the spot was advertising a real business.

In April 2009, Big Dog Eat Child released Jones’ Good ASS BBQ and Foot Massage, and followed with  Jones’ Cheap ASS Prepaid Legal and Daycare Academy in November 2009. Subsequent releases have included recordings of actual phone messages left on 'Toby's’ voice mail, a series of "Ask Toby" advice videos, and spoofs of 'Legal Retraction & Clarification' videos from the 'urban entrepreneur'.

Recognition for the videos (often in competition with real commercials) has often been as wacky as the spots themselves:
Esquire.com’s Daniel Murphy included Jones’ Big Ass Truck Rental and Storage among "The Five Most Terrifying Local TV Christmas Commercials".
Jimmy Traina at Sports Illustrated.com named it "Commercial of the Day".
In the UK, Channel 4's Rude Tube TV show listed Jones’ Big Ass Truck Rental and Storage at #13 on its list of the top 50 viral videos.
Duncan Riley of The Inquisitor urged his readers to "Check out the funniest home made commercial of the year."
Zagat, the famed food and restaurant guide, named Jones’ Good ASS BBQ and Foot Massage one of "The 8 Wackiest BBQ Commercials".

During the NBA Playoffs in 2016, Stephen Curry, the all-star guard for the Golden State Warriors, stayed loose before games by dancing and singing with arena employees to the Jones' Barbecue and Foot Massage jingle. The pre-game ritual is apparently linked to Curry's assertion that big players who switch onto him are "barbecue chicken". During a segment that year on ABC's Good Morning America, Hines was asked what he thought of all the media attention he was getting from Curry's pre-game routine, to which he replied, "You're welcome Steph!"

Jail material
In 2012, Hines began devoting an increasing amount of his stand-up performances to material from his days as a Correctional Officer. Hines had largely avoided the topic earlier in his career due to training he received that urged officers to pursue outside interests and to compartmentalize their work at the jail as a way to avoid burnout.

Filmography

References

External links
 Robert L. Hines Official site
 
  Robert L Hines YouTube Channel
 Website for Jones’ Big ASS Website & Merchandise Center

Living people
1970 births
American stand-up comedians
21st-century American comedians
African-American male actors
African-American male comedians
American male comedians
21st-century African-American people
20th-century African-American people